Stanovišče is a small settlement in the Municipality of Kobarid in the Littoral region of Slovenia. It is located in the Breginj Combe.

References

External links
Stanovišče on Geopedia

Populated places in the Municipality of Kobarid